Veräjämäki (Finnish) or Grindbacka (Swedish) is a neighborhood of Helsinki, Finland.

Neighbourhoods of Helsinki